Mohamed Seif Edine Amroune (born May 25, 1983 in Constantine) is an Algerian football player.

Club career
In 2003, Amroune began his senior career with his hometown club of CS Constantine. In 2005, he joined CR Belouizdad.

RAEC Mons
In July 2007, Amroune went on trial with Belgian club S.V. Zulte Waregem. However, two days later, he signed a four-year contract with another Belgian club, R.A.E.C. Mons. On August 12, 2008, he made his debut for the club as a substitute in the 78th minute in a league game against Mechelen. On January 5, 2009, Amroune left the club after agreeing to terminate his contract by mutual consent. He made just one appearance during his time with the club, after failing to recover properly from his injury.

On January 17, 2009, Amroune went on trial with Portuguese club Naval. In July 2009, Amroune went on trial with French Championnat National side Troyes.

International career
On March 24, 2007, Amroune made his debut for the Algerian National Team in a 2008 Africa Cup of Nations qualifier against Cape Verde. Amroune started the game on the bench and replaced Hameur Bouazza in the 88th minute as Algeria won the game 2-0.

References

External links
 DZFoot Profile
 FootGoal Profile
 

1983 births
Living people
Algerian footballers
Algeria international footballers
R.A.E.C. Mons players
Belgian Pro League players
CR Belouizdad players
CS Constantine players
Algerian expatriate sportspeople in Belgium
Algerian expatriate footballers
Footballers from Constantine, Algeria
MO Constantine players
Algerian Ligue 2 players
Expatriate footballers in Belgium
MSP Batna players
Algeria youth international footballers
Association football forwards
21st-century Algerian people